Ferroviário may refer to sports clubs in:

Angola
 C.D. Ferroviário do Huambo, a football club from Huambo
 Clube Ferroviário da Huíla, a football club from Lubango
 Clube Ferroviário de Luanda, a football club from Luanda

Brazil
 Ferroviário Atlético Clube (CE), a football club from Fortaleza, Ceará
 Ferroviário Atlético Clube (AL), a defunct football club from Maceió, Alagoas
 Ferroviário Atlético Clube (RO), a football club from Porto Velho, Rondônia
 Ferroviário Esporte Clube, a football club from São Luís, Maranhão
 Ferroviário Esporte Clube (Serra Talhada), a football club from Serra Talhada, Pernambuco
 Operário Ferroviário Esporte Clube, a football club from Ponta Grossa, Paraná
 Clube Atlético Ferroviário, a defunct football club from Curitiba, Paraná and forming Colorado Esporte Clube and Paraná Clube
 Clube Ferroviário do Recife, a football club from Recife, Pernambuco

Mozambique
 Clube Ferroviário da Beira (disambiguation)
 Clube Ferroviário da Beira (basketball), a basketball club from Beira
 Clube Ferroviário da Beira (football), a football club from Beira
 Clube Ferroviário de Maputo, a football and basketball club from Maputo
 Clube Ferroviário de Nacala Velha, a football club from Nacala
 Clube Ferroviário de Nampula, a football club from Nampula
 Clube Ferroviário Pemba, a football club from Pemba
 Clube Ferroviário de Quelimane, a football club from Quelimane